KYXK (106.9 FM, "Arkansas Rocks FM") is a radio station licensed to serve Gurdon, Arkansas, United States.  The station is owned by Arkansas Rocks Radio Stations Network. It airs a classic rock format known as Arkansas Rocks FM.

The station was assigned the KYXK call letters by the Federal Communications Commission on February 8, 1993.

References

External links

YXK
Classic rock radio stations in the United States
Clark County, Arkansas
Radio stations established in 1987
1987 establishments in Arkansas